Jardine is a surname. Notable people with the surname include:

 Al Jardine (born 1942), member of the Beach Boys
 Alexander Jardine (Medal of Honor) (1874–1949), American Medal of Honor recipient
 Antonio Jardine (born 1988), NCAA college basketball player for the Syracuse Orange
 Cassandra Jardine (1954–2012), British journalist and writer
 Christine Jardine (born 1960), British politician
 David Jardine (disambiguation), several people:
 David Jardine (1840–1892), of David and John Jardine, US architect
 David Jardine Jardine (1847–1922), Scottish landowner and racehorse owner
 David Jardine (barrister) (1794–1860), English barrister and magistrate
 David Jardine (footballer) (born 1867), Scottish football goalkeeper
 David Jardine (merchant) (1818–1856), taipan of the Jardine, Matheson & Co.
 Don Jardine (1940–2006), American professional wrestler
 Douglas Jardine (1900–1958), English cricketer
 Sir Ernest Jardine, 1st Baronet (1859–1947), Scottish MP
 Frank Jardine (ice hockey) (1924–1999), British ice hockey player
 Francis Lascelles Jardine (1841–1919), Australian pioneer
 George Jardine, Scottish religious minister and academic
 George Jardine (rugby league), Australian rugby league footballer
 James Jardine (disambiguation), several people:
 James Jardine (engineer) (1776–1858), Scottish civil engineer, mathematician and geologist
 James Jardine (cricketer, born 1794) (1794–1872), English cricketer
 James Jardine (judge) (1846–1909), English cricketer, academic, barrister and judge
 James Jardine (Medal of Honor) (1837–1922), Union Army soldier and Medal of Honor recipient
 James Bruce Jardine (1870–1955), British soldier and diplomat
 James Willoughby Jardine (1879–1945), British judge and  politician
 John E. Jardine (1838–1920) of David and John Jardine, US architect 
 John Jardine (football coach) (died 1990), American football coach
 Sir John Jardine, 1st Baronet (1844–1919), Scottish Liberal politician and businessman
 Keith Jardine (born 1975), American mixed martial artist
 Lisa Jardine (1944–2015), British historian
 Nicholas Jardine (born 1943), British mathematician, philosopher of science and its history, and historian
 Ray Jardine, American author and adventurer
 Rick Jardine, Canadian mathematician
 Quintin Jardine Scottish author
 Sandy Jardine (1948–2014), Scottish footballer
 Taylor Jardine (1990–), lead singer for the pop-punk band We Are the In Crowd
 James W. Jardine (1908–1977), City of Chicago Water Commissioner;  Jardine Water Purification Plant named for him
 Sir William Jardine, 7th Baronet (1800–1874), Scottish naturalist
 Walter Jardine (1884–1970), Australian commercial artist
 William Jardine (disambiguation), several people:
 William Jardine (1784–1843), Scottish surgeon and businessman
 William Jardine (merchant), Scottish surgeon and merchant, of Jardine, Matheson & Co.
 Sir William Jardine, 7th Baronet (1800–1874), Scottish naturalist
 William Marion Jardine (1879–1959),  U.S. Secretary of Agriculture, Ambassador to Egypt
 William Murray Jardine (born 1984), 24th Chief of Clan Jardine
 William Jardine, editor of the Farmer's Almanac

See also
 Clan Jardine, a lowland Scottish clan
 Jardine baronets
 Buchanan-Jardine baronets